Juan Bono (1893-1979) was an Argentine stage and film actor. He appeared in eighteen films during his career, most during the Golden Age of Argentine Cinema.

Selected filmography
 Paths of Faith (1938)
 Savage Pampas (1945)
 Puppet (1957)

References

Bibliography 
 Finkielman, Jorge. The Film Industry in Argentina: An Illustrated Cultural History. McFarland, 24 Dec 2003.

External links 
 

1893 births
1977 deaths
Argentine male film actors
Argentine male stage actors